Pterocarya fraxinifolia  is a species of tree in the Juglandaceae family.  It is commonly known as the Caucasian wingnut or Caucasian walnut.  It is native to the Caucasian region Armenia, Azerbaijan, Georgia, Iran, Russia, Ukraine  and  Turkey. It was introduced to France in 1784, and to Great Britain after 1800.

Description

The tree is monoecious and grows to a height of < 30 m, the short, thick bole supporting widely spreading branches to form a rounded structure, not unlike the wych elm.  The pinnate leaves can exceed 60 cm in length, comprising 7 - 27 sessile leaflets. The flowers appear in April, the male catkins thick and green, 7.5 – 12.5 cm long, the females longer with less dense flowers, bearing red styles forming fruiting catkins 30 – 50 cm long, the green, winged, nuts approximately 1.8 cm wide.

Ecology
The species is fast growing and grows best on flat ground or shallow slopes near river banks and in deep moist soils. The climate associated with the distribution of this tree includes mild winters and mild humid summers. It generally grows in mixed stands with other species and rarely grows in pure stands.

Fossil record
Fossils of Pterocarya fraxinifolia have been described from the fossil flora of Kızılcahamam district in Turkey, which is of early Pliocene age.

References

External links
 Pterocarya fraxinifolia - information, genetic conservation units and related resources. European Forest Genetic Resources Programme (EUFORGEN)

fraxinifolia
Plants described in 1798
Least concern plants
Trees of Azerbaijan
Trees of Turkey
Taxonomy articles created by Polbot